Pternidora is a genus of moths belonging to the subfamily Olethreutinae of the family Tortricidae.

Species
Pternidora koghisiana Razowski, 2013
Pternidora phloeotis Meyrick, 1911

See also
List of Tortricidae genera

References

External links
tortricidae.com

Enarmoniini
Tortricidae genera
Taxa named by Edward Meyrick